Leigh Izaak Francis (born 30 April 1973), known professionally as Keith Lemon, is an English comedian, actor, writer, and television presenter. He is best known for creating and starring in Channel 4's sketch comedy show Bo' Selecta! (2002–2009) and presenting the ITV shows Celebrity Juice (2008–2022) and Through the Keyhole (2013–2019). His other comedy shows include Lemon La Vida Loca (2012–2013), The Keith Lemon Sketch Show (2015–2016), and The Keith & Paddy Picture Show (2017–2018).

Early life
Francis was born in Beeston, Leeds, West Riding of Yorkshire, on 30 April 1973, and was brought up on a council estate in Old Farnley, Leeds. His father died aged 47 of cancer, whilst his mother, Pat, is still alive.

Francis attended Farnley Park High School (now The Farnley Academy). He later studied at Jacob Kramer College and received a qualification in graphic design. Before making his major television breakthrough, he was discovered and encouraged by television presenter Davina McCall, performing in-role stand-up comedy in a southern comedy club.

McCall landed Francis his first television role on Dom and Kirk's Nite O' Plenty, where he portrayed Bobby Stark, a man who gives tips on how to win over the ladies. The series aired on Paramount Television from January to July 1996. Francis' second television role was as Barry Gibson, a music paparazzo, featured on the early series of Channel 4's Popworld. Francis also starred as various characters, including Gibson, Keith Lemon and Avid Merrion in the series Whatever I Want, which aired late night on ITV in 2000.

Career
In his early career, Francis did a series of shorts for Comedy Central (then  known as Paramount Comedy) called Stars in Their Houses. Some of the shorts can be found on YouTube.

His major television breakthrough occurred when Channel 4 offered him a £250,000 deal to produce a series based on his television characters, such as his previous roles as Bobby Stark and Barry Gibson, and in 2002, Bo' Selecta! was born. The series featured Francis portraying a series of celebrities by wearing face masks to impersonate them, as well as portraying the main, non-celebrity character, Avid Merrion. The programme lasted for five series, airing between 2002 and 2006, however, the last two series were only loosely based on the original three. Series 4 was subtitled A Bear's Tail, and was based on another of his characters, The Bear. Series 5 returned to Avid Merrion and was called Bo! in the USA.

Following the axing of Bo' Selecta!, Francis took one of the series characters, Keith Lemon, and created a brand new show, Keith Lemon's Very Brilliant World Tour, which aired on ITV2 in April 2008. The show was a success, and subsequently, Francis created another new show featuring Lemon, Celebrity Juice, which has aired 23 series to date. Lemon also co-hosted Sing If You Can (2011) with Stacey Solomon and Keith Lemon's LemonAid (2012) on ITV. In November 2011, it was revealed that Lemon would make his feature film debut in Keith Lemon: The Film, with production starting later that month.

Francis has since presented and/or appeared in numerous other ITV2 programmes in character as Lemon, including Through the Keyhole (2013–2019), The Keith Lemon Sketch Show (2015–2016), The Keith & Paddy Picture Show (2017–2018), alongside Paddy McGuinness and Shopping with Keith Lemon (2019–present). Francis had a cameo in Rocketman, the 2019 Elton John biopic, playing a shop worker named Pete.

Personal life
On 30 October 2002, at Allerton Castle, North Yorkshire, Francis married Jill Carter, a beauty therapist. In February 2009, their daughter, Matilda, was born.

On 4 June 2020, Francis apologised on Instagram, as himself, for his portrayal of various black celebrities on Bo' Selecta!. In the video description he added "Following recent events, I've done a lot of talking and learning and I would like to put this out there. I want to apologise to anyone that was offended by Bo'selecta. I'm on a constant journey of knowledge and just wanted to say I'm deeply sorry. #blacklivesmatter".

Characterisation
In interviews, Francis usually adopts one of his celebrity guises, being interviewed as Avid Merrion during Bo' Selecta!'''s run between 2002 and 2006, and as Keith Lemon ever since. In an out-of-character interview with On: Yorkshire Magazine, Francis confirmed Avid Merrion's accent and dialects were inspired by his former tutor at Jacob Kramer College, Laimonis Mieriņš. He also pointed out Merrion is a misspelling of Mieriņš, and has nothing to do with the Merrion Centre in Leeds as some may have assumed.  Francis has also been interviewed as himself for The Frank Skinner Show, Loose Women, Big Brother's Little Brother, The Museum of Curiosity and Friday Night with Jonathan Ross''.

Characters

Filmography

Television

Film

References

External links
 

1973 births
Living people
20th-century English male actors
21st-century British screenwriters
21st-century English male actors
21st-century English writers
Alumni of Leeds Arts University
Best Entertainment Performance BAFTA Award (television) winners
Comedians from Yorkshire
English male television actors
English television writers
Male actors from Leeds
People from Farnley, Leeds
British male television writers